is a Japanese politician of the Liberal Democratic Party, a member of the House of Representatives in the Diet (national legislature). A native of Nagahama, Shiga and graduate of Kyoto University, he joined the Ministry of Home Affairs (now part of the Ministry of Internal Affairs and Communications) in 1990. After an unsuccessful run 2003, he was elected for the first time in 2005. In 2010, he ran for governor of Shiga, but lost to incumbent Yukiko Kada.

See also 
Koizumi Children

References

External links 
 Official website in Japanese.

Members of the House of Representatives (Japan)
Koizumi Children
Kyoto University alumni
People from Shiga Prefecture
Living people
1965 births
Liberal Democratic Party (Japan) politicians